The Zhengzhou–Minquan Expressway, often referred to as Zhengmin Expressway and designated as S82 in Henan's expressway system, is  long regional expressway in Henan, China. The expressway connects Zhengzhou and Minquan County.

History
The first phase of the expressway, which is from Zhengzhou to Kaifeng, was opened on 29 December 2011.  This section provides a fast connection to Zhengzhou Xinzheng International Airport for Kaifeng. The second phase is from Kaifeng to Minquan, and was opened on 26 September 2016.

The expressway was built with reserved conditions for military aircraft to land and take-off during war time. Such drills had been performed on the expressway in 2014.

Exit list

References

Expressways in Henan
Transport in Henan
Expressways in Zhengzhou